Komorzno  is a village in the administrative district of Gmina Wołczyn, within Kluczbork County, Opole Voivodeship, in south-western Poland.

The name of the village is derived from the old Polish word komor, meaning "mosquito".

Komorzno's heritage monuments are the church of Saint Hedwig, the old park and preserved old village houses.

Notable people
 (1621–1690), Polish religious writer, poet, translator
 (1626–1693), Polish official, royal secretary
Samuel Ludwik Zasadius (c. 1695–1756), Polish religious writer, pastor, author of popular sermons and prayer-books
Andrzej Sokołowski (born 1948), former Polish handball player, 1976 Summer Olympics bronze medalist

References

Villages in Kluczbork County